The 1999–2000 Phoenix Coyotes season was the Coyotes' fourth season in Phoenix, the franchise's 21st season in the NHL and 28th overall. The Coyotes made the Stanley Cup playoffs, losing in the first round to Colorado.

Off-season

Regular season
The Coyotes struggled on the power play, scoring only 37 power-play goals, tied with the Buffalo Sabres for 28th in the League.

Final standings

Schedule and results

Playoffs

Western Conference Quarterfinals

(W3) Colorado Avalanche vs. (W6) Phoenix Coyotes
The first two games were in Colorado. Games 1 and 2 were won by Colorado. Game 1 was won by a score of 6–3, and game 2 was won by a score of 3–1. Games 3 and 4 were in Phoenix. Colorado was victorious in game 3 4–2, but the Coyotes won game 4 3–2. Back in Colorado, the Avalanche went on to win 2–1 and take the series 4–1.

Player statistics

Regular season
Scoring

Goaltending

Playoffs
Scoring

Goaltending

Awards and records

Transactions

Trades

Waivers

Free agents

Draft picks
Phoenix's draft picks at the 1999 NHL Entry Draft held at the FleetCenter in Boston, Massachusetts.

See also
 1999–2000 NHL season

References
 

Pho
Pho
Arizona Coyotes seasons